Mian Rud (also Romanized as Mīān Rūd, Meyan Rūd, and Miyan Rood; also known as Kalāteh Miyānrūd and Kalāteh-ye Mīān Rūd) is a village in Naharjan Rural District, Mud District, Sarbisheh County, South Khorasan Province, Iran. At the 2006 census, its population was 193, in 63 families.

References 

Populated places in Sarbisheh County